Mohanpur Kamalpur  is a village of Sukhipur municipality in Siraha District of Madhesh pradesh of south-eastern Nepal. At the time of the 1991 Nepal census it had a population of 4065 people living in 729 individual households.

References

External links
UN map of the municipalities of  Siraha District

Populated places in Siraha District